Mordellistena angusticeps is a beetle in the genus Mordellistena of the family Mordellidae. It was described in 1949 by Ray.

References

angusticeps
Beetles described in 1949